Dixie Speedway is a 3/8 mile clay oval in Woodstock, Georgia.
Located 30 miles north of downtown Atlanta, the track features over 5,000 permanent seats on a 150-acre property.

Opened in 1968, the venue has been owned by Mickey and Martha Swims since 1976.

Touring series that visit the speedway include American Flat Track and the Late Model Dirt Series by Lucas Oil.
The track also holds a season-opening doubleheader, the Schaeffer's Oil Spring Nationals, in cooperation with nearby Rome Speedway.

Races
 American Flat Track
 Yamaha Atlanta Short Track presented by Cycle Gear
 Lucas Oil Late Model Dirt Series
 Lucas Oil Dixie Shootout
 USCS Outlaw Thunder Tour

Records
 Sprint car: Joe Gaerte, 0:12.190
 Super late model: David Payne, 0:13.579

References

Motorsport venues in Georgia (U.S. state)
Sports venues completed in 1968
1968 establishments in Georgia (U.S. state)